Palmas-d'Aveyron is a commune in the department of Aveyron, southern France. The municipality was established on 1 January 2016 by merger of the former communes of Palmas, Coussergues and Cruéjouls.

See also 
Communes of the Aveyron department

References 

Communes of Aveyron